Hugo Batalla Parentini (July 11, 1926 – October 3, 1998), Uruguayan politician, was Vice President of Uruguay from 1995 to 1998 during the presidency of Julio María Sanguinetti.

Background
His political activity started in the Colorado Party with Zelmar Michelini. Batalla was elected diputado for the Department of Montevideo from 1962–66 and 1967–71, and was President of the Chamber of Deputies of Uruguay from 1969 to 1970. He was also a member of the Latin American Parliament and Vice-President from 1968–69.

He split from Colorado in 1971 to form the Frente Amplio with Michelini, and was re-elected diputado from 1972 until the instauration of the military dictatorship in June 1973.

After the return of constitutional rule, he was elected senator for the Partido por el Gobierno del Pueblo (Peoples' Government Party, which would later rejoin the Frente Amplio) from 1985–1995, and was Vice-President of the Chamber of Senators during 1993.

Vice President of Uruguay
Batalla rejoined the Colorado Party for the elections of 1994-11-27 and was elected Vice President of Uruguay.

He died in office of lung cancer at the age of 72.

Historical note
Batalla was the eleventh person to hold the office of Vice President of Uruguay. The office dates from 1934, when Alfredo Navarro became Uruguay's first Vice President.

Other activities
Aside from politics, Batalla founded the newspaper Hechos and the political magazine Zeta. He was also President of the Asociación Uruguaya de Fútbol (AUF, Uruguayan Football Association) from 1991–93, and Vice-president of the Confederación Sudamericana de Fútbol (CSF, South American Football Confederation) between 1992 and 1993.

Personal
Batalla married Hilda Flores in 1953, and the couple had a daughter Laura.

See also
 Politics of Uruguay

References

1926 births
1998 deaths
Vice presidents of Uruguay
Presidents of the Senate of Uruguay
Uruguayan vice-presidential candidates
Deaths from lung cancer in Uruguay
University of the Republic (Uruguay) alumni
Place of birth missing
Colorado Party (Uruguay) politicians
Presidents of the Chamber of Representatives of Uruguay
20th-century Uruguayan lawyers
Football people in Uruguay
Presidents of the Uruguayan Football Association
CONMEBOL